{{DISPLAYTITLE:62 knot}}

In knot theory, the 62 knot is one of three prime knots with crossing number six, the others being the stevedore knot and the 63 knot.  This knot is sometimes referred to as the Miller Institute knot, because it appears in the logo of the Miller Institute for Basic Research in Science at the University of California, Berkeley.

The 62 knot is invertible but not amphichiral. Its Alexander polynomial is

its Conway polynomial is

and its Jones polynomial is

The 62 knot is a hyperbolic knot, with its complement having a volume of approximately 4.40083.

Surface

Example
Ways to assemble of knot 6.2 

If a bowline is tied and the two free ends of the rope are brought together in the simplest way, the knot obtained is the 62 knot. The sequence of necessary moves are depicted here:

References

Double torus knots and links